ARCS is a firmware bootloader (also known as a PROM console) used in most computers produced by SGI since the beginning of the 1990s.

The ARCS system is loosely compliant with the Advanced RISC Computing (ARC) standard, promulgated by the Advanced Computing Environment consortium in the early 1990s. In another sense, the ARC standard is based on SGI's ARCS, which was used as a basis for generating the ARC standard itself, although ARC calls for a little-endian system while ARCS system is big-endian on all MIPS-based systems.  Despite various inconsistencies between the two, both SGI's ARCS implementations and the ARC standard share many commonalities (such as device naming, calling conventions, etc.).

Most of the computers which use the ARCS firmware are based on the MIPS line of microprocessors. The SGI Visual Workstation series, which is based on the Intel Pentium III, also uses ARCS. The Visual Workstation series is the only commercially produced x86-compatible system which used an ARCS firmware, rather than the traditional PC BIOS used in most Intel 386-lineage machines.

A list of product lines which use the ARCS console includes:
SGI Crimson (IP17)
SGI Indigo (R4000/R4400) (IP20)
SGI Indigo2 (and Challenge M) (IP22)
SGI Indy (and Challenge S) (IP24)
SGI Onyx (IP19/IP21/IP25)
SGI Indigo2 R8000 (IP26)
SGI Indigo2 R10000 (IP28)
SGI O2 (IP32)
SGI Octane (IP30)
SGI Origin 200 (IP27)
SGI Origin 2000 (IP27/IP31)
SGI Onyx2 (IP27/IP31)
SGI Fuel (IP35)
SGI Tezro (IP35)
SGI Origin 300 (IP35)
SGI Origin 350 (IP35)
SGI Origin 3000 (IP27/IP35)
SGI Onyx 300 (IP35)
SGI Onyx 350 (IP35)
SGI Onyx 3000 (IP27/IP35)
SGI Onyx4 (IP35)
SGI Visual Workstation models 320 and 540 (later models were BIOS-based PCs)

Boot loaders
Advanced RISC Computing